"My Pledge of Love" is a song written and performed by singer-songwriter Joe Stafford, Jr. of the American rhythm-and-blues band Joe Jeffrey Group. It was released in April 1969, as the group's first single, and was produced by Jerry Meyers and Alan Klein. It appeared on the group's only album My Pledge of Love, which was released in 1974.

Background and composition 
The 2-minute-43-second song is in the key of C major with a tempo of 75 beats per minute.

The song, presumably sung to Stafford's significant other, is about how he "felt so fine" thinking about her one morning, how badly he needs and loves her, and how the song acts as his "pledge of love". In the bridge of the song, Stafford repeats the words "Baby I need your loving, got to have all your loving," which intentional or not, is an interpolation of the chorus from the Four Tops' 1964 hit "Baby I Need Your Loving".

On the B-side is a song titled "Margie".

Reception and commercial performance 
Billboard called the record a "driving rhythm ballad by a potent group, given an exceptional vocal workout," while Record World wrote of it, "Teens will be feeling fine when they hear this pick-me-up rock. Joe and [the] gang are infectious," referencing the song's lyrics. Cashbox described it as "pretty kind-of-an-oldie, with an easygoing beat and fine vocal showing that gives the newcomer act a solid piece of hit material."

The song was initially sent to radio stations in Vancouver, (CKLG) and Cleveland, Ohio, before it took off nationally in May and June, entering the Bubbling Under Hot 100 at number 26 for the week of May 31, 1970, and the Billboard Hot 100 at number 84 for the week ending June 7, 1970, going on to peak at number 14, and spending a total of 12 weeks on the chart. It also charted in several other countries, including Canada, Australia, Brazil, the Netherlands, and the Philippines. It was the group's highest charting hit, and only hit to reach the Hot 100, and as far as known, any of the five other charts, with the exception of their cover of White Plains' "My Baby Loves Lovin'". However, they did reach the Bubbling Under chart with a few future releases, following the success of "My Pledge of Love."

Cover versions 

 Tirso Cruz III on his debut studio album, 1969
 James Darren on his album Mammy Blue, 1971

Charts

Weekly charts

Year-end charts

References

Notes 

 1969 singles
 1969 songs
Scepter Records singles
Wand Records singles